Cheras usually refers to the Chera dynasty, an Indian dynasty that ruled over parts of the present-day states of Kerala and Tamil Nadu.

Cheras may also refer to:
 Cheras, Kuala Lumpur, a suburb of Kuala Lumpur, Malaysia
 Cheras (federal constituency), represented in the Dewan Rakyat
 Poliklinik Cheras, a female governmental hospital in Kuala Lumpur
 Cheras Selatan, a township that stretches from Kuala Lumpur to Kajang in Selangor, Malaysia
 Cheras LRT station, an at-grade rapid transit station situated near and named after the Kuala Lumpur township of Cheras, Kuala Lumpur, Malaysia
 Cheras Highway, a major highway in Kuala Lumpur, Malaysia

See also
 Chera (disambiguation)